Time for Brass, is a long running radio programme broadcast on Manx Radio and features music ostensibly from British Brass bands.
The show is presented by Ian Cottier, a former headmaster at Douglas High School.

Time for Brass features music from various brass bands ranging from early recordings to contemporary Brass Band Music.
Also included on the playlist are recordings by Manx bands such as the Onchan Silver Band and Rushen Silver Band.

The programme is transmitted on the station's 9:00pm – 10:00pm slot on Monday nights and is broadcast on FM and MW frequencies as well as world wide through the Manx Radio website.

Following transmission the edition is then available on the Manx Radio website to be listened to again for the following seven days.

Whilst Manx Radio is a commercial radio station, Time for Brass is not interrupted by the playing of commercials.

References

Manx Radio programmes
British music radio programmes